Callen James Adomitis (born July 9, 1998) is an American football long snapper for the Cincinnati Bengals of the National Football League (NFL). He played college football at Pittsburgh.

Early life and high school
Adomitis was born on July 9, 1998, in Pittsburgh, Pennsylvania. He attended Central Catholic High School there, earning varsity letters in football and playing the tight end and long snapper positions.

College career
Adomitis committed to the University of Pittsburgh, and saw immediate playing time as a true freshman playing long snapper. He played in all 12 games, and  also made two tackles. He appeared in 14 games as a sophomore, making four tackles on the year. He played in all 13 games in 2019 as a junior, making four tackles again. In 2020, he started in all 11 games, bringing his streak to 50 consecutive appearances. He made one tackle on the year, and at the end was named a first-team all-Atlantic Coast Conference (ACC) long snapper.

As a fifth-year player in 2021, he appeared in every game and was named first-team All-American, becoming the first NCAA-recognized All-American selection at the position. He also won the 2021 Patrick Mannelly Award, given to the best long snapper in the nation.

Professional career

After going unselected in the 2022 NFL Draft, Adomitis was signed by the Cincinnati Bengals as an undrafted free agent. He was waived on August 30, 2022 and signed to the practice squad the next day. Following a week 1 injury to longtime long snapper Clark Harris, Adomitis was signed to the active roster on September 12. He made his NFL debut against the Dallas Cowboys in week two. He finished the season with 15 regular season games played, while posting two tackles. Adomitis also appeared in the Bengals' three playoff games, and recorded an additional tackle.

Personal life
Adomitis raised over $114,000 in 2021 to donate towards the Children's Hospital of Pittsburgh.

References

Further reading

External links
 Cincinnati Bengals bio
 Pittsburgh Panthers bio

1998 births
Living people
American football long snappers
Players of American football from Pittsburgh
Pittsburgh Panthers football players
Cincinnati Bengals players